Synuchus sikkimensis is a species of ground beetle in the subfamily Harpalinae. It was described by Andrewes in 1934.

References

Synuchus
Beetles described in 1934
Taxa named by Herbert Edward Andrewes